Ayers House may refer to:

in Australia
 Ayers House (Adelaide), South Australia

in the United States
William Ayers House, Fort Smith, AR, listed on the NRHP in Arkansas
Ayers-Little Boarding House, Carnesville, GA, listed on the NRHP in Georgia
Ayers House (Lewistown, Montana), listed on the NRHP in Montana
Ayers-Allen House, Metuchen, NJ, listed on the NRHP in New Jersey